The 1968–69 Miami Floridians season was the first season of the Floridians in the American Basketball Association. The team had moved from Minnesota after one season as the Muskies. The Floridians finished one game behind the Pacers, for a second place finish. They faced the replacement for them in Minnesota, the Pipers. They beat them in a close 7 game series to set up a chance to go to the ABA Finals. In the Eastern Division Finals, they lost to the Indiana Pacers 4 games to 1.

Roster
 23 Andrew Anderson - Shooting guard
 20 Donnie Freeman - Shooting guard
 41 Les Hunter - Power forward
 24 Ervin Inniger - Shooting guard
 21 Willie Iverson - Point guard
 23 Nick Jones - Guard
 42 Gary Keller - Center
 22 Maurice McHartley - Point guard
 44 Willie Murrell - Small forward
 22 Ron Perry - Point guard
 33 Don Sidle - Power forward
 32 Dan Sparks - Power forward
 43 Skip Thoren - Center
 34 Dallas Thornton - Small forward

Final standings

Eastern Division

Playoffs
Eastern Division Semifinals vs. Minnesota Pipers

Floridians win series, 4–3

Eastern Division Finals vs Indiana Pacers 

Floridians lose series, 4–1

Awards and honors
1969 ABA All-Star Game selections (game played on January 28, 1969)
 Donnie Freeman
 Les Hunter
 Skip Thoren

References

 Floridians on Basketball Reference

External links
 RememberTheABA.com 1968-69 regular season and playoff results
 Miami Floridians page

Miami Floridians seasons
Miami
Miami Floridians, 1968-69
Miami Floridians, 1968-69